Tom Habberfield (born 19 May 1992) is a Welsh rugby union player who plays scrum half for Cardiff RFC. He also previously played for the Ospreys (Rugby Union) and Bridgend Ravens.

In November 2011 he was named in the Wales sevens squad.

In April 2012 he was named in the Wales Under-20 squad for the Junior World Cup in South Africa.

References

External links 
 Bridgend profile

Rugby union players from Bridgend
Welsh rugby union players
Ospreys (rugby union) players
Living people
1992 births
Rugby union scrum-halves
Rugby union wings
Cardiff Rugby players